Arta Region is one of the six regions of Djibouti. It was officially created in 2003 by the regrouping of districts of the regions of Dikhil and Djibouti. It is situated in the south-central of the country, bordering the Tadjoura Region to the north, and the Djibouti Region to the north-east, and Dikhil Region the Ali Sabieh Region to the south, the country of Somaliland lies to the east.

The capital of Arta Region is Arta. Other towns include We`a, Damerjog and Loyada. The Hemed mountain is the highest point in the region of Arta.

History
Nomadic life in the Arta Region dates back at least 2,000 years. During the Middle Ages, the Arta Region was ruled by the Ifat Sultanate and the Adal Sultanate. It later formed a part of the French Somaliland protectorate in the first half of the 20th century. Loyada village has a beautiful beach and a picturesque palm grove and the tombs of great historical leaders of this region. Halfway between Loyada and Djibouti, the small village of Damerjog and gardens with traditional irrigation systems. The Region of Arta is situated at the boundary of the Afar and Issa Somali sociolinguistic groups.

Overview

This region has an area of around 1,800 square kilometers. According to the 2009 Census, the local population consists of 42,380 individuals, 17,775 of whom are nomads.
Arta was established after the end of the Djiboutian Civil War in 1994. In 2000, peace talks between various factions of the Somali Civil War were held in Arta city, resulting in the establishment of the Transitional National Government of Somalia.
The Region's coast is noted for its marine life, including like turtles, dolphins, whale sharks, manta rays, giant grouper, blue spotted rays and other varieties of sharks. Located on the heights of the Arta mountains, more than 700 meters, Arta has a mild climate and is located approximately 20 minutes from Djibouti city with views of the Gulf of Tadjoura.

Volcanology
In 1972, a seismism detection network was installed by the Paris Institute of Earth Physics (IPGP), three stations were created in Arta, Tadjourah, Atar. In 1996, the Geoscope station was moved to Arta tunnel at the same time as the 3 component station of Arta (ARO became ATD). Today, the geophysical observatory of Arta is operated jointly by the IPGP, the Djiboutian Ministry of Higher Education and Research and the Center for Study and Research of Djibouti.

Climate

The climate of Arta Region is generally semi-arid to arid, and its territory is mostly covered by mountains, high plains, and desert. The climate of the coastal strip is influenced by warm ocean waters, keeping the region free from extremes of temperature and providing moisture for rainfall. However, most of the Arta Region populace experience two weather seasons: a "winter" period of rather cold and warm temperatures and higher levels of rainfall and a sultry summer period of hot, sticky temperatures.

The annual mean statistics for some Arta Region centres is shown below:

Towns

References

 
Regions of Djibouti